Jonathan Alan Patz is an American academic who is a professor and John P. Holton Chair of Health  and the Environment at the University of Wisconsin-Madison, where he also serves as Director of the Global Health Institute. Patz also holds appointments in the Nelson Institute for Environmental Studies and the Department of Population Health Sciences at the University of Wisconsin. He serves on the executive committee of the Tyler Prize for Environmental Achievement and was elected in 2019 to the National Academy of Medicine.

His research focuses primarily on: global health, public health, global climate change, infectious diseases, urban air pollution, land use change, the built urban environment and transportation planning effects on health—sometimes referred to as health Co-benefits of climate change mitigation. His work on co-benefits appeared in the Forbes Magazine article "Climate Change Best Case Scenario: Save Millions, Make Trillions." In 2017, Rotary International covered Patz' research on climate-health impacts in their article "The Rotarian Conversation: Your health is at risk". His research has focused on geographic regions in Africa, Amazonia, and the United States.

Early life and education
Patz was born in Baltimore, Maryland. Patz attended the Baltimore Friends School, a private Quaker coeducational school for students Pre-Kindergarten to Grade 12. He attended Colorado College for his undergraduate degree and received a Bachelor of Arts in Biology in 1980. Patz received his Medical Degree in 1987 from Case Western Reserve University School of Medicine and completed his residency in Family Medicine at the Medical University of South Carolina in 1990. In 1992, he completed a Masters in Public Health at the Johns Hopkins Bloomberg School of Hygiene and Public Health. He then completed an Environmental and Occupational Medicine Residency at Johns Hopkins in 1994 and became certified by the American Board of Occupational and Environmental Medicine in 1997.

Career and publications
Patz was a family medicine clinician in Missoula, Montana, and Baltimore, Maryland from 1990 to 1994. In 1994, he became a full-time researcher at Johns Hopkins Bloomberg School of Public Health in the Department of Environmental Health Sciences. Since then, Patz has published 188 research items; has 55,206 reads; and 21,576 citations, according to Research Gate. In 1996, his paper “Global Climate Change and Emerging Infectious Disease" was published in the Journal of the American Medical Association(JAMA). His other peer-reviewed scientific publications, have appeared in accredited journals such as Nature, Science, PNAS, Lancet, JAMA, American Journal of Public Health, Journal of Emerging Infectious Diseases, and Environmental Health Perspectives, also focus on publicizing the public health effects of climate change. In 2005, his research article, "Impact of regional climate change on human health" was featured on the cover of Nature and has over 3,000 citations to date.

Patz has also held a variety of positions in which he has furthered the discussion on the public health effects of climate change. Beginning in 1998, Patz served as Co-chair of the Health Expert Panel for the first US National Assessment on Climate Variability and Change.  Patz also served as Founding President of the International Association for Ecology and Health from 2006-2010, convening diverse scientists and professionals around health crises stemming from global climate and ecological change. In 1997, he organized and led the first briefing on climate change and health to then EPA Administrator Carol Browner on why climate change matters to public safety. Patz has also co-chaired the health expert panel of the first U.S. National Assessment on Climate Change, a report mandated by the U.S. Congress. Patz has testified on climate change and health in both houses of Congress, state legislatures, and has given invited presentations to the National Academy of Sciences (NAS).  He has served on five scientific committees of the NAS, and on a recent committee of the Presidential Council of Advisors on Science and Technology (PCAST).  He has also served on science advisory and FACA committees for several federal agencies. He was invited on two occasions to brief the Dalai Lama on the inequities posed by climate change, following a widely cited peer-reviewed quantitative assessment led by Patz in 2007, comparing carbon dioxide-emitting countries with countries burdened most by climate-sensitive diseases. Also in 2007, the UN Intergovernmental Panel on Climate Change was awarded a Nobel Peace Prize, of which Jonathan Patz was a member alongside Al Gore, though Patz name is not on the medal.

In September 2015, Patz addressed the Physicians for Social Responsibility’s Climate Health Summit to inform participants about the health implications of climate change. Patz also delivered a keynote presentation at the University of Geneva in February 2015. His most recently published book, Climate Change and Public Health co-authored with Barry S. Levy, further describes the implications of climate change with a focus on the adverse public health effects.

Involvement at the University of Wisconsin-Madison
In 2004, Patz joined the University of Wisconsin-Madison as an Associate Professor of the Nelson Institute for Environmental Studies and the Department of Population Health Sciences. In 2008 he became a full professor as well as a faculty affiliate of the Robert M. La Follette School of Public Affairs. In 2011 Patz was appointed to serve as the inaugural Director of University of Wisconsin-Madison’s campus-wide Global Health Institute. In this role, he has placed climate change and health at the forefront of the campus mission of “sustainable global health” – health for today without compromising natural resources for health tomorrow. Patz has also fostered partnerships between the Global Health Institute and the UW Energy Institute, the Nelson Institute for Environmental Studies, and the campus’ Office of Sustainability, among other organizations and groups.

Patz has trained a generation of young professionals in this new field and designed environmental health courses around the theme, “Health Impact Assessment of Global Environmental Change.” Patz has also developed a number of graduate-level courses and taught WHO workshops on global environmental health, and he has advised many PhD and Masters students.  He directs a “Certificate in Humans and the Global Environment,” that emerged from his directing (as Principal Investigator) a National Science Foundation (NSF) Integrated Graduate Education and Research Traineeship (IGERT) award. He developed and taught a MOOC (Massive Open Online Course) on Climate Change Policy and Public Health in November 2015 to close to 10,000 people from across 179 countries.

A non-exhaustive list of peer-reviewed journal articles
 Stull V and Patz J. Research and Policy Priorities for Edible Insects (2019). Sustainability Science,  https://doi.org/10.1007/s11625-019-00709-5
 Stull VJ, Kersten M, Bergmans RS, Patz JA, Paskewitz S. (in press) Crude Protein, Amino Acid, and Iron Content of Tenebrio molitor Reared on an Agricultural Byproduct from Maize Production: an Exploratory Study. Annals of the Entomological Society of America.
 Sippy R, Herrera D, Gaus D, Gangnon R, Osorio J, and Patz J. Seasonality of Dengue Fever in Rural Ecuador: 2009-2016. PLOS NTDs, Dec, 2018.  http://dx.doi.org/10.1101/452318   
Limaye VS, Vargo J, Harkey M, Holloway T, Patz JA. (2018), Climate Change and Heat-Related Excess Mortality in the Eastern USA. EcoHealth , August, 2018, https://doi.org/10.1007/s10393-018-1363-0
 Stull VJ, Finer E, Bergmans R, Febvre H, Patz JA, Weir TL.  Impact of Edible Cricket Consumption on Gut Microbiota in Healthy Adults, a Double-blind, Randomized Crossover Trial. Scientific Reports 2018 (in press).  http://dx.doi.org/10.1038/s41598-018-29032-2 
 Patz JA and West JJ. The Paris Agreement could save lives in China. Lancet Planetary Health 2018; April:2(4):147-148.  http://dx.doi.org/10.1016/S2542-5196(18)30052-4  
 Abel DW, Holloway T, Harkey M, Meier P, Ahl D, Limaye VS, Patz JA. (2018) Air-quality-related health impacts from climate change and from adaptation of cooling demand for buildings in the eastern United States: An interdisciplinary modeling study. PLoS Med 15(7): e1002599. https://doi.org/10.1371/journal.pmed.1002599    [4 citations, 1-3-2019]
 Meier P, Holloway T, Patz J, Harkey M, Ahl D, Scott Schuetter S, Hackel S. Impact of warmer weather on emissions due to building energy use. Environmental Research Letters; 2017; 12: 064014. https://doi.org/10.1088/1748-9326/aa6f64
 Abel D, Holloway T, Kladar RM, Meier P, Ahl D, Harkey M, Schuetter S , Patz J.  Response of Power Plant Emissions to Ambient Temperature in the Eastern United States. Environmental Science and Technology (2017) in press.  http://dx.doi.org/10.1021/acs.est.6b0620 
 Patz JA. Solving the global climate crisis: the greatest health opportunity of our times?  Public Health Reviews.  https://doi.org/10.1186/s40985-016-0047-y 
 Levy BS and Patz JA. Climate change, human rights and social justice. Annals of Global Health, 2015; 81 (3); 310-322.  http://doi.org/10.1016/j.aogh.2015.08.008
 Goldberg T and Patz JA.  The need for a global health ethic (Comment). The Lancet, July 16, 2015 http://dx.doi.org/10.1016/S0140-6736(15)60757-7
 Patz JA, Grabow ML, Limaye VS. "When is rains, it pours: future climate extremes and health."  Annals of Global Health, October 2014.
 Patz JA, Frumkin H, Holloway T. Vimont DJ, Haines A.  "Climate change: challenges and opportunities for Global Health." Journal of the American Medical Association. 2014;312(15): 1565-1580.
 Hahn MB, Olson S Vittor A, Barcellos C, Patz JA, Pan, W. "Conservation Efforts and Malaria in the Brazilian Amazon."  American Journal of Tropical Medicine  2013.
 Patz JA and Hahn MB. "Climate change and health: A One Health Approach."  Current Topics in Microbiology and Immunology. November 2012. DOI: 10.1007/82_2012_274
 Grabow ML, Spak SN, Holloway TA, Stone B, Mednick AC, Patz JA. "Air quality and exercise-related health benefits from reduced car travel in the Midwestern United States."  Environmental Health Perspectives 2011; 120:68-76.
 Li B, Sain S, Mearns LO, Anderson HA, Kovats RS, Ebi KL, Patz JA. "The impact of heat waves on morbidity in Milwaukee, Wisconsin."  Climatic Change, 2011; DOI 10.1007/s10584-011-0120-y
 Olson SH, Gangnon R, Silveira G, Patz JA. "Deforestation links to malaria in Mancio Lima County, Brazil." Journal of Emerging Infectious Diseases 16 (7) 2010:1108-1115.
 Vittor AY, Pan W, Gilman RH, Tielsch J, Glass GE, Shields T, Sanchez Lozano, W, Pinedo VV, Patz JA. "Linking deforestation to malaria in the Amazon: Characterization of the breeding habitat of the principal malaria vector, Anopheles darling."  American Journal of Tropical Medicine and Hygiene 2009; 81(1):5-12.
 Patz JA, Vavrus S, Uejio C, McClellan S. "Climate Change and Waterborne Disease Risk in the Great Lakes Region of the US." American Journal of Preventive Medicine  2008;35(5):451–458.
 Patz JA, Gibbs, HK, Foley JA, Rogers JV, Smith KR. "Climate Change and Global Health: Quantifying a Growing Ethical Crisis."  EcoHealth  2007 4(4): 397-405.
 Patz JA, Campbell-Lendrum D, Holloway T, Foley, JA.  "Impact of regional climate change on human health."  Nature (cover) (2005);438: 310-317.
 Patz JA, Hulme M, Rosenzweig C, Mitchell TD, Goldberg RA, Githeko AK, Lele S, McMichael AJ, Le Sueur D.  "Regional warming and malaria resurgence."  Nature 2002;420:627-628.
 Glass, GE, Yates TL, Fine FB, Shields TM, Kendall JB, Hope AG, Parmenter CA, Peters CJ, Ksiazek TG, Li CS, Patz JA, Mills JN.  "Satellite imagery characteristics local animal reservoir populations of Sin Monbre virus in the southwestern United States."  Proceedings of the National Academy of Sciences  2002;99:16817-16822.
 Curriero FC, Patz JA (Corresponding Author), Rose JB, Lele S.  "Analysis of the association between extreme precipitation and waterborne disease outbreaks in the United States, 1948-1994." American Journal of Public Health  2001 (Aug) 91:1194-99.

Research
Patz and his research team focus on the cusp of climate change and health. Patz served as Principal Investigator for an EPA STAR grant in 1996 entitled, “Integrated Assessment of the Public Health Effects of Climate Change for the US and US territories”, one of the first federal grants awarded on this subject. This project led to over 20 peer-reviewed research papers.  Scientific discoveries under his team leadership on this and subsequent projects include: the impact of climate change on increased risk for asthma; the relationship between heat wave mortality and latitude, and identifying populations most vulnerable to heat-related morbidity; the association of Hantavirus outbreaks with El Niño in the Southwestern US; the relationship between waterborne disease outbreaks across the US and heavy rainfall events; the link between South American cholera outbreaks and childhood diarrheal diseases to El Niño; altered mosquito-borne malaria and dengue fever risks from projected climate change; and increased malaria risk from combined land use and local climatic change in the Amazon Basin.  His team’s recent research has targeted and substantially contributed to a new area of climate change and health assessment: health “co-benefits” of greenhouse gas mitigation policies.

Awards
Patz holds various notable awards including:
 National Academy of Medicine, Elected Member, 2019
 The Chanchlani Global Health Award, 2019
 Alumni Special Recognition award from Case Western School of Medicine, 2017  
 Homer Calver Award for Leadership in Environmental Health, American Public Health Association, 2015 
 The John P Holton Endowed Faculty Chair in Health and the Environment, 2015 – present
 Fulbright Scholar Award, 2014
 H.I. Romnes Faculty Fellowship Award of the University of Wisconsin, 2009
 Nobel Peace Prize, 2007 (awarded to UN IPCC Lead Authors & Co-chairs, along with Al Gore)
 Zayed International Prize for the Environment, 2006 (awarded to Lead Authors and Co-chairs of the Millennium Ecosystem Assessment)
 Aldo Leopold Leadership Fellow, 2005
 Senior Fellow of the UW Program for World Affairs and the Global Economy, 2005
 Family Medicine Teaching Award, 1989

References

American activists
Living people
Year of birth missing (living people)
Johns Hopkins Bloomberg School of Public Health
Case Western Reserve University School of Medicine alumni
Colorado College alumni
University of Wisconsin–Madison faculty
Members of the National Academy of Medicine